Victor Klees (18 October 1907 – 15 April 1995) was a Luxembourgian water polo player. He competed in the men's tournament at the 1928 Summer Olympics. He also played football as a defender, and appeared two times for the Luxembourg national team.

References

1907 births
1995 deaths
Luxembourgian male water polo players
Olympic water polo players of Luxembourg
Water polo players at the 1928 Summer Olympics
Sportspeople from Luxembourg City
Luxembourgian footballers
Luxembourg international footballers
Association football defenders